Straßkirchen is a municipality  in the district of Straubing-Bogen in Bavaria in Germany.

References

Straubing-Bogen